My Scene (stylized in all lowercase) is an American series of fashion dolls that Mattel released in 2002. 
They were discontinued in the US in 2008, and worldwide in 2011. Mattel's Barbie character is one of the dolls in the toy line. The My Scene dolls' bodies are slim, similar to earlier Barbie dolls, but their heads are larger. The New York Times described their features as "exaggerated lips and bulging, makeup-caked eyes." My Scene were designed to appeal to the tween market and compete with the Bratz dolls from MGA Entertainment.

Products and history 

Mattel introduced My Scene dolls in the fall season of 2002 to compete with MGA's Bratz. The series originally consisted of three female characters with diverse ethnicities and personalities; Mattel added more dolls over time. Its three original dolls, Barbie, Madison, and Chelsea, each came with two extra fashions. Except for Barbie, the characters were named after New York City locations. Mattel added more dolls to the series, starting with Nolee and three male characters, Bryant, River, and Hudson, in the year of 2003. Delancey and Ellis also premiered in the "Hanging Out" line, which introduced in late 2003. Kenzie introduced in 2004's "Getting Ready Line," and Nia introduced in the year of 2008. There are seven characters in the My Scene series (Kennedy, Madison, Chelsea, Delancey, Nia, Hudson, and River), six discontinued characters (Barbie, Nolee, Kenzie, Bryant, Ellis, and Sutton) and four special edition dolls (Lindsay, Jai, Tyson and Ryan). Each of the My Scene girls (and three of the boys) own pets.

Female My Scene dolls have a non-twisting, navel-sculpted body mold and share a face mold, developed specifically for the brand, that dons a small nose, wide cheekbones, and large, pouty lips. Some lines' dolls (beginning with "Night on the Town") have rooted eyelashes and glittery eyes. Like the Bratz, these dolls have large shoes that serve as feet, but they also have traditional Barbie feet and can wear regular Barbie shoes. Male dolls also feature My Scene-exclusive face molds; their body molds originated with previous male dolls.

In the year of 2004, Mattel produced new smiling face molds for both male and female characters, which were present for only a short while on the female dolls, whereas male dolls featured these molds until early 2005. Beginning with the "Club Birthday" line, the My Scene dolls' face molds changed to non-smiling molds that more closely resembled the "Bratz Boyz" line of dolls.

In late 2005, Mattel released a My Scene line called "My Bling Bling", which introduced a new eye screening that looked more sultry compared to previous releases. Later, in mid-2006, Barbie was dropped from the line in favor of a new character named Kennedy, who would be introduced in the “Fab Faces” line.

Beginning with the "Swappin' Styles" line of 2006, Mattel produced two more new face molds for female dolls—one with a half-open smile and the other, a closed smirk. This line also re-released the "Getting Ready" smiling face mold.

In the year of 2007, a somewhat controversial line was launched, called "Growing Up Glam," these dolls feature a turnable key on their back that can make the doll grow taller and grow breasts, similar to the infamous "Growing Up Skipper" doll.

Mattel ceased selling My Scene dolls in the US in 2008, but continued to sell the dolls internationally, until Mattel ceased production on the My Scene line as a whole in the year of 2011.

Legal issues 
On April 13, 2005, Mattel's competing toy company, MGA Entertainment, filed a lawsuit against Mattel for its My Scene brand, alleging duplication of its Bratz dolls'  multi-ethnic looks, fashions, and packaging. The suit further accused Mattel of "engaging in acts of unfair competition and intellectual property infringement intended to damage its market share, confuse consumers and trade on the company's goodwill."

In 2006, Mattel countersued MGA Entertainment, alleging that Bratz creator Carter Bryant had been working for Mattel when he developed the idea for Bratz in 1999 and had taken the idea to MGA secretly, with MGA in turn developing the first-generation Bratz dolls while obscuring Bryant's involvement. Bryant and Mattel reached a settlement before trial, at which a federal jury awarded Mattel $100 million in damages for the violation of their intellectual property in 2008, and further issued an injunction that forced MGA to stop producing Bratz.

In a 2011 retrial, however, MGA toy makers claimed that in producing the My Scene dolls, Mattel had stolen their trade secrets and violated antitrust laws, and sought $1 billion in damages. The judge found in favor of Mattel, and MGA received an award totaling $309.9 million, freeing the company to produce Bratz once again—at which time Mattel retired the My Scene line.

Product List

Doll Lines 

2002

"Wave 1": Barbie, Madison and Chelsea.

2003

"Spring Break": Barbie, Madison, Chelsea, Nolee (first appearance), Hudson (first appearance), and Bryant (first appearance).
"Back to School": Barbie, Madison, Chelsea, Nolee, Bryant (last appearance), Hudson, River (first appearance), and Sutton (first appearance).
"Night on the Town" two-doll giftset: Barbie with River, Madison with Sutton and Chelsea with Hudson.
"Night On The Town Sound Lounge" doll with Playset: Nolee.
"Chillin' Out": Barbie, Madison, Chelsea and Nolee.
"Vespa" giftset with Vespa scooter: Barbie, Madison and Chelsea.
"Hanging Out": Barbie, Madison, Chelsea, Nolee, Delancey (first appearance) Hudson, River (Same as Back to School), Sutton and Ellis (first appearance).
"Cruisin' in My Ride" two-doll giftset with convertible: Barbie with Ellis, Madison with Sutton and Delancey with Hudson.
"A Ride in the Park" giftset with bicycle (Dolls Same as Hangin' Out): Barbie, Madison and Nolee.
"Tunin' In" giftset with radio (Target Exclusive): Madison, Chelsea and Delancey.

2004

"Jammin' in Jamaica" with DVD: Barbie, Madison, Chelsea, Nolee, Delancey, Hudson, River, Sutton and Ellis.
"Jammin' in Jamaica: Surfrider" giftset with jetski: Madison, Chelsea and Tyson (only appearance).
"Jammin' in Jamaica: Cruisin' the Boardwalk" two-doll giftset with tandem bicycle: Jai (only appearance) with Sutton, and Barbie with River.
"Getting Ready: My Room" giftset with closet: Barbie, Chelsea and Nolee.
"Getting Ready: Out With the Girls" (all-male line): Hudson, River and Sutton.
"Getting Ready: In My Tub" giftset with tub: Madison and Kenzie (first appearance).
"Getting Ready: Out and About" two-doll giftset: Madison with Sutton, Chelsea with Hudson and Delancey with Ellis (last appearance).
"Heartbreakers": Barbie and Madison.
"Feelin' Flirty": Barbie, Madison, Chelsea and Delancey.
"Working Radio" (Latin America Exclusive): Barbie and Chelsea.
"Shopping Spree":
Barbie: Levi's
Madison: Aldo
Chelsea: Trinkets
Nolee: Sephora
Delancey: Target (Target Exclusive)
Kenzie giftset with kiosk cart: Mall Must-Haves
"Masquerade Madness" with DVD:
Barbie: Butterfly Punk
Madison: City Kitty
Chelsea: Mermaid Diva
Nolee: Rocker Girl
Delancey: Dream Genie (US Exclusive)
Kenzie: Disco Derby (US Exclusive) (last appearance)
Hudson: Boxer
River: Elvis
Sutton: Vampire
"Masquerade Madness Party Pad Loft" Doll (UK Exclusive) with Playset:
Madison: City Kitty
"Dressed to Impress" Special Edition: Barbie and Madison.

2005

"Miami Getaway": Barbie, Madison, Chelsea and Nolee.
"Miami Getaway Vespa" giftset with Vespa scooter: Delancey and Kenzie (last appearance).
"Miami Getaway Happenin' Hotel" doll with playset: Delancey.
"Club Birthday": Barbie, Madison, Chelsea, Nolee, Hudson, River and Sutton (last appearance).
"Day and Nite": Barbie, Madison, Chelsea and Nolee.
"Teen Tees": Barbie, Madison, Chelsea and Nolee.
"My Design Scene" Only doll or Giftset with Case (Target Exclusive):
Barbie:
Pink Tee (Same as Hangin' Out)
Spaghetti Strap (Same as Wave 1)
Madison:
Green Top (Same as Hangin' Out)
Striped Top (Same as Spring Break)
Chelsea:
Striped Top (Same as Jammin' In Jamaica)
Flower Top (Same as Wave 1)
Nolee:
Monkey Tee (Same as Shopping Spree)
Spaghetti Strap (Same as Spring Break)
"Swappin' Styles": Barbie, Madison, and Nolee.
"Secret Locker" giftset with locker: Barbie, Madison, and Chelsea.
"My Scene Goes Hollywood": Barbie, Madison, Chelsea, Nolee, Lindsay Lohan (only appearance), Hudson and Ryan Ridley (only appearance).
"My Bling Bling": Barbie, Madison, Chelsea and Nolee.

2006

"Project Runway" (Specially Designed Barbie by Nick Verreos).
"Mall Maniacs":
Barbie: Claire's and Trinkets (Walmart US Exclusive)
Chelsea: Skechers
Madison: Bath & Bubble Boutique
Nolee: Mudd
Hudson: Made in the Shade
River: Sound Town
"Tu Estilo" (Latin America Exclusive): Barbie, Chelsea and Nolee.
"Teen Tees" Second Edition (Same as the first edition, but not with pets): Barbie, Madison, Chelsea and Nolee.
"Year of Style":
Barbie: Winter
Madison: Summer
Chelsea: Spring
Nolee: Autumn
"Street Style" (UK Exclusive): Barbie (last appearance), Madison, Chelsea and Nolee.
"Fab Faces" / "Fab Expressions": Kennedy (first appearance), Madison, Chelsea and Nolee.
"Let's Go Disco" two-doll giftset: Kennedy with Chelsea and Madison with Nolee.
"Swappin' Styles" (Second Edition): Kennedy, Madison, Chelsea and Nolee (Canada and Latin America Exclusive) (Same as Madison).
"Un-fur-gettable": Kennedy, Madison, Chelsea and Nolee (Canada and Latin America Exclusive) (Same as Madison).
"City Stars": Kennedy, Madison, Chelsea and Nolee.
"My Bling Bling Bikini" : Kennedy, Madison, Chelsea and Nolee (Canada and Latin America Exclusive) (Same as Madison).
"My Bling Bling Spa" Doll with Playset: Delancey.

2007

"My Bling Bling" or "Super Bling" (Second Edition, same as the First Edition, but not with the ring and extra outfit): Kennedy, Madison (with the first outfit of the first edition), Chelsea and Nolee (with the second outfit of the first edition).
"Roller Girls": Kennedy, Madison, Chelsea, Nolee.
"Roller Girls Remote Control": Kennedy and Madison.
"Sailor Sweeties": Kennedy and Chelsea.
"Sporty Style":
Kennedy: Yoga
Madison: Tennis
Chelsea: Skateboarding
Nolee: Tennis (Canada and Latin America Exclusive) (Same as Madison)
"Juicy Bling" / "Tropical Bling": Kennedy, Madison, Chelsea and Nolee (Australia and Latin America Exclusive) (Same as Madison).
"I Love My Friends" two-doll giftset: Kennedy with Madison and Chelsea with Nolee.
"I Love My Friends Bedroom" doll with playset: Delancey (UK Exclusive).
"Rebel Style": Kennedy, Madison, Chelsea, and Nolee (last appearance) (clothing same as Madison).
"Juicy Bling Bikini" / "Tropical Bling Bikini": Kennedy, Madison, Chelsea and Delancey.
"Icy Bling": Kennedy, Madison, Chelsea and Delancey.
"Growing Up Glam": Kennedy, Madison, Chelsea and Delancey.
"Foto Fabulous" two-doll giftset: Kennedy with Chelsea and Madison with Delancey.
"Junglicious" / "Salon Safari":
Kennedy: Leopard
Madison: Monkey
Chelsea: Giraffe
Delancey: Zebra
"Totally Charmed": Kennedy, Madison, Chelsea and Delancey.

2008

"PJ Party": Kennedy, Madison, Chelsea and Delancey.
"Rockin' Awards": Kennedy, Madison, Chelsea and Delancey.
"Sporty Glam":
Kennedy: Running.
Chelsea: Dance.
Delancey: Yoga.
"Sporty Glam" two-doll giftset:
Kennedy with Madison: Tennis.
Chelsea with Delancey: Beach volleyball.
"Club Disco": Kennedy, Madison, Chelsea and Delancey.
"Street Sweet": Kennedy, Madison, Chelsea and Delancey.
"Cafe Chic": Kennedy, Madison, Chelsea and Delancey.
"Floral Fiesta": Kennedy, Madison, Chelsea and Delancey.
"Splashy Chic": Kennedy, Madison, Chelsea and Delancey.
"Snow Glam": Kennedy, Madison, Chelsea and Delancey.
"I Love Shopping": Kennedy, Madison, Chelsea and Delancey.
"Golden Bling": Kennedy, Madison, Chelsea and Delancey.
"Perfume Party": Kennedy, Nia (first appearance), Chelsea and Delancey.
"Karaoke Divas": Kennedy, Nia, Chelsea and Delancey.

2009

"Bee" (Russia Exclusive): Kennedy.
"Club Night": Kennedy, Madison, Chelsea and Delancey.
"Street Art": Kennedy, Madison, Chelsea and Delancey.
"Street Art" doll with scooter: Kennedy.
"Ultra Glam": Kennedy, Madison, Chelsea and Delancey.
"Ultra Glam" doll with playset: Kennedy.
"Love" two-doll giftset: Kennedy with River (last appearance) and Chelsea with Hudson (last appearance)
"Hollywood Bling": Kennedy, Madison, Nia and Chelsea.
"Boutique Street": Kennedy, Madison, Nia and Chelsea.
"Cabana Beach": Kennedy, Chelsea, and Delancey.
"Weekend Chic": Kennedy, Chelsea, and Delancey.
"Cool Nights": Kennedy, Chelsea, and Nia.
"Coasterama": Kennedy, Chelsea, and Delancey.
"Fashion Week": Kennedy, Madison, Chelsea, and Nia.
"Jewel It": Kennedy, Madison, Chelsea, and Delancey.
"Lots of Looks": Kennedy, Madison, Chelsea, and Nia, each with three interchangeable faces (Winking, Original My Scene, and the SwS Kennedy/ Roller Girls face)

2010

"City Diva": Kennedy, Madison, Chelsea and Nia.
"City Diva" Giftset with Scooter: Kennedy.
"Glam Beach": Kennedy, Nia and Chelsea.
"Disco Girls": Kennedy, Nia and Chelsea.
"Bling Boutique": Kennedy, Chelsea, Madison (last appearance), and Nia.
"Fashion Cuties": Kennedy, Delancey (last appearance), and Nia.
"Fashion Boutique": Kennedy, Nia and Chelsea.
"Pop Diva": Kennedy, Nia and Chelsea.

2011

"Bling Nights": Kennedy, Chelsea and Nia.
"Style" / "Season Style": Kennedy, Chelsea and Nia.

Styling Heads

2003

"Styling Heads" (First Edition): Madison, and Chelsea.

2004

"Styling Heads" (Second Edition): Nolee, and Delancey.

2005

"My Bling Bling": Barbie and Madison.

2007

"Roller Girls": Kennedy and Madison.
"Juicy Bling": Kennedy and Madison.
"Totally Charmed": Kennedy and Madison.

McDonald's Happy Meal Toys

2005

"City Scene": Barbie(#1), Madison(#7), Chelsea(#2) and Delancey(#8).
"Beach Party": Barbie(#5), Madison(#3), Chelsea(#6) and Nolee(#4).

2007

"Roller Girls": Kennedy, Madison, Chelsea and Nolee.

27" Stylin' Friend

2005

"27" Stylin' Friend" (First Edition): Barbie, Madison and Chelsea.

Soft Pets

2005

"Miami Getaway": Yorkie, Bella and Churro.

Playsets And Cars

2003

"Spring Break":
"My Ride" (Red)
"My Ride" (Blue)
"My Café"
"My Boutique"
"My Club"
"Back to School":
"So Chic Salon"
"Night on the Town":
"The Sound Lounge" with Nolee.
"Makeup Scene"
"Cruisin' in My Ride":
"Silver Convertible" with Delancey and Hudson.
"Black Convertible" with Madison and Sutton.
"Date Scene/Black Convertible" with Barbie and Ellis.
"Hanging Out":
"The Daily Dish Café"

2004

"Jammin' in Jamaica":
"Guava Gulch Tiki Lounge"
"My Beach Ride" (Cooper)
"My Beach Ride" (Purple)
"Getting Ready":
"Chelsea Style"
"Shopping Spree":
"My Dressing Room"
"Masquerade Madness":
"Party Pad Loft" (based on Madison's loft apartment outside the UK) with Madison (UK Exclusive).
"My Ride" (Silver)
"My Ride" (Pink)

2005

"Miami Getaway":
"Happenin' Hotel" with Delancey.
"Styles to Go":
"Dress and Go"
"Shop And Go"
"Club Birthday":
"My Ride"
"My Scene Goes Hollywood":
"Dressing Room"
"Luxury Limo"
"My Bling Bling":
"Wheels Vehicle"

2006

"Mall Maniacs":
"Claire's Accessory Store"
"Skechers Shoe Store"
"My Bling Bling Bikini":
"My Bling Bling Spa" with Delancey.

2007

"I Love My Friends":
"Delancey's Bedroom" with Delancey (UK Exclusive).
"Icy Bling":
"Icy Bling Boutique"

2008

"Snow Glam":
"Snow Glam Car"

2009

"Secrets & Dreams Diary"

 Media franchise 
Starting in the year of 2003 with the "Hanging Out" line, Mattel began packaging My Scene dolls with DVDs that contained short video clips, music, and activities. This began a trend that sparked three My Scene films, all of which aired on the Nickelodeon cable network. The My Scene line also features four special edition dolls present only in the My Scene films. These include the Jamaican-American characters Jai and Tyson from Jammin' in Jamaica, and Ryan Ridley (a new fictional character) and Lindsay Lohan from My Scene Goes Hollywood. Mattel received special rights to create the only likeness of Lohan for the line.

 Films 
Mattel released three My Scene films between 2004 and 2005 as follows:

 My Scene: Jammin' in Jamaica (2004) My Scene: Jammin' in Jamaica was released to DVD on May 15, 2004, and later premiered on Nickelodeon on June 6, 2004. It was sold with the "Jammin' in Jamaica" dolls and was directed by Eric Fogel, the creator of Celebrity Deathmatch. The plot involves Madison who is the manager of a band called Urban Desire, which is made up of the four male characters. When the band wins a contest, they make a trip to Jamaica for the finals, but Barbie, Nolee, and Chelsea must raise the money to travel to Jamaica.  After all the characters arrive in Jamaica, Barbie feels left out as her boyfriend, the lead guitarist, begins spending more time with Madison. This causes a rift between the friends but is eventually resolved.

 My Scene: Masquerade Madness (2004) My Scene: Masquerade Madness was the second My Scene film, released to DVD on June 1, 2004, and later premiered on Nickelodeon on October 24, 2004. It runs 28 minutes long, half the length of Jammin' in Jamaica. The plot revolves around the Masquerade Madness fashion show, a fundraiser for the local animal shelter. Chelsea designs the fashions for the show all on her own, causing strain on her schoolwork. Failing in geometry and too embarrassed to tell her friends, she calls on Hudson's help in tutoring. As a result, her friends begin to think they are secretly dating. In the end, Chelsea has aced her geometry test and coordinated a successful fashion show. This film was sold with the My Scene "Masquerade Madness" dolls.

 My Scene Goes Hollywood: The Movie (2005) My Scene Goes Hollywood, was the first and only film to be sold apart from the dolls and the only full-length film. Eric Fogel reprised his role as director. It was released to DVD on August 30, 2005 by Buena Vista Home Entertainment under the Miramax Family label, and later premiered on Nickelodeon on October 23, 2005. It featured a voice-over by actress and singer Lindsay Lohan, who plays as herself. Kelly Sheridan of the Barbie film series reprised her role as Barbie. The plot involves the My Scene girls pretending to be extras in a spy action movie being filmed in New York City, in order to see it up close. When one of the actresses is injured, Madison is called upon to take her place. She begins spending less and less time with her friends and develops a crush on the leading actor, Ryan Ridley. Madison ends up fighting with her friends because they embarrass her. In the end, Lohan convinces Madison that friends are the most important thing to have, and the girls make up.  Although the title suggests a trip to Hollywood, the setting of the film actually takes place in New York City.

 Web series 
My Scene is a web series that ran from 2002 until 2008 on the My Scene official website. The theme song of the series is "It's My Scene".

 "My Scene webisodes" (2002-2008) 
There are 30 episodes released on the official website between 2002 and 2008, some of which were featured in "B Cinemas" on the BarbieGirls.com website. The last 10 episodes did not feature Barbie and Nolee after being discontinued from the line. The following is the list of episodes in published order (according to timeline):

 "My Scene Spanish episodes" (2004-2005) 
There are 23 episodes released between 2004 and 2005 that were only featured in Spanish (and Portuguese). The animation art style changed, similar to the one used for Jammin' in Jamaica. The following is the list of episodes (in English and Spanish) in published order (according to timeline):

 Video games 
"My Scene" (PC) (2003)
"My Scene Goes Hollywood" (PC) (2005)

 Website 
The official My Scene website was launched in 2002 which included games, webisodes, character bios and videos. Even though the line was discontinued in 2011, the website closed in 2014 alongside the Pixel Chix website.

 Characters 

 The "My Scene" Girls 
 Barbie  is "...cute but edgy", with pale skin, blonde hair, and blue eyes. Her birthday is September 30 and her astrological sign is Libra. Her favorite place is the spa and she loves yoga, massage, and pedicures, chatting with cute guys, and going to movies and parties with her friends. Her favorite beverage is iced coffee and she can't live without her cellphone. River is her boyfriend. Her pet is Yorkie. She moved to California and was replaced by Kennedy. Barbie is voiced by Kelly Sheridan, who is also starred in the Barbie film series.
 Madison (Westley in Europe) is African-American, with dark skin, light blue eyes and medium brown hair. She was one of the original three dolls and the 'shopper' of the gang. According to the official My Scene website, she is an urban girl, who enjoys traveling in style, spending her time getting manicures at her favorite spa, and going shopping. She is romantically paired with Sutton. Her birthday is August 3 and her astrological sign is Leo. She lives with her father and can't go anywhere without her journal. In Europe, she is called "Westley", for unknown reasons (perhaps to have the same final -ee syllable on her name as the five other girls), but in the US, she is named after Madison Avenue, a major shopping district. Her pet is Bella. Madison is voiced by Kathleen Barr.
 Chelsea has light (then pale) skin, brown/hazel eyes, and auburn hair. Chelsea is an artist and was one of the original dolls. She wants to be a fashion designer and according to the official website, her signature look is "...original and funky." Her birthday is November 10 and her astrological sign is Scorpio. She loves retro clothing stores, her prized possession is her notebook and she loves pets. She is named after the Chelsea neighborhood in New York City, and her pet alternates between Mambo and Churro. Chelsea is voiced by Nicole Bouma.
 Nolee is of Asian-American descent, with black hair, light skin, and brown eyes. She was the fourth doll in the My Scene line and is a fortune-telling skater girl. Her birthday is May 23 and her astrological sign is Gemini. She dated Bryant until 2003, the year Bryant was dropped from the My Scene line after he moved to London. According to the official website, she is good at keeping secrets, believes in good luck and karma, and her look is described as "athletic". She was discontinued in the shows. She is named after Nolita in New York and her pet is Cookie. Nolee is voiced by Tegan Moss.
 Delancey is of Irish and Italian descent. This doll was originally produced with maroon-streaked platinum blonde hair, green eyes, pale skin, and a beauty mark on her cheek. In 2007, she was produced with dark brown hair with blonde streaks and greenish-blue eyes. She is from California and is a skater and surfer. She is Chelseas cousin. According to the My Scene website, she enjoys the beach. Ellis is her boyfriend. Her birthday is May 10 and her astrological sign is Taurus. Her look is edgy, funky, and colorful. She was named after Delancey Street in New York City. Her pet is named Sugar. Delancey is voiced by Meghan Black.
 Kenzie has red hair, lightly freckled skin, and green eyes and is from Atlanta, Georgia. Kenzie has appeared four times since she was introduced in 2004. She and Nolee were very close and, according to the official website, Kenzie works at her cart in the shopping mall and also creates scents. Her birthday is June 25 and her astrological sign is Cancer. She likes to make people laugh, and her style is characterized as "cute." Her pet is Coco, and was a repaint of Barbie's dog, Yorkie. Kenzie is voiced by Ashleigh Ball.
 Kennedy has golden-blonde hair, light (then tanned) skin, and gray-blue eyes. She replaced Barbie in 2006 after Barbie moved to California. She enjoys going to cafés, parties, and traveling. Kennedy is an Aquarius who is "...a celebrity in training" and came from Hollywood. She is named after John F. Kennedy International Airport in New York City and her pet is Yorkie, a dog.
 Nia has green eyes, tanned skin, and strawberry-blonde hair. The newest Latina in the group, she was introduced in 2008. Born in Mexico City, she now lives in Miami. She is a DJ. The official website states that she likes to be loud, funny, and the life of any party. Her astrological sign is Libra and she loves reading romance books.
 Jai is dark-skinned with brown eyes and dark brown hair. She is from the Caribbean country of Jamaica, and sells clothes and jewelry made by herself at a stand. There she met Sutton, who flirts with her, and was sold in a gift set with him in the "Jammin' in Jamaica: Bicycle Built for Two" line. Her astrological sign is Taurus. Her pet is a Chihuahua dog named Blanca. Jai is voiced by Brenda M. Crichlow.
 Lindsay Lohan – Mattel received special rights to create the only likeness of actress and singer Lindsay Lohan for their "My Scene Goes Hollywood" line.

The "My Scene" Boys

 Bryant has green eyes and strawberry blonde hair. He was introduced in Game On along with Hudson and made his last appearance in Rumor Has It before moving to London. According to the official website, he is an Aquarius born on February 6, snacks on wasabi green peas, loves video cameras, likes to skateboard, and would not watch a buddy cop movie. He is probably happiest when he's behind a camera, as he loves documenting every moment. He was marketed as Nolee's boyfriend. It is rumored he was created to look like American Idol'' runner-up Justin Guarini. Recently, a character identical in appearance to Bryant was featured in a webisode on Kennedy's homepage. He is never supposed to be Bryant, but a rock star who went to school with Kennedy in Hollywood. Bryant was named after New York's Bryant Park. Bryant was the least produced of the boys and discontinued in 2003.
 Hudson is Caucasian with light blue eyes, pale skin, and blonde hair. He was one of the first male dolls to be introduced in the My Scene line and is often romantically paired with Chelsea. According to the official website, his favorite sport is soccer, he likes to hang out in Central Park, he gets around on foot, and cell phones are his pet peeve. He is named after the Hudson River in New York, and his sign is Capricorn due to his December 23 birthday. Hudson is voiced by Kirby Morrow.
 River has dark hair, a fair skin tone, and brown eyes. He is Barbie's boyfriend. According to the official website, he is a rock musician, his birthday is on December 3 (or 6) and his sign is Sagittarius. His favorite music is the post-punk genre, he snacks on tofu dogs and likes girls with a great smile. He lives for music, as he feels it's the only way he can express himself, so he plays with a few different bands. He is also named after the Hudson River in New York. River is voiced by Alessandro Juliani.
 Sutton is African-British with dark brown hair, brown skin, and eyes, and he's from London. His character is less developed than those of Hudson and River; the original Sutton doll came with art supplies, while later dolls came variably with musical and computer accessories. He's sometimes romantically paired with Madison and, according to the official website, he has an urban look. He was born on April 17 and his sign is Aries. His favorite food is french fries, although "[he] calls 'em "chips," he makes his own music, and looks for a girl who's "sweet...but can get sassy, too!" He likes New York City. He's supposed to be a bit of a ladies' man, as well as a fantastic dancer. He's named after Sutton in South London. Sutton is voiced by Mark Hildreth.
 Ellis is characterized as Caucasian, with brown hair, a pale skin tone, and green eyes. He is Delancey's boyfriend. According to the official website, his birthday is March 1 and his sign is Pisces. His favorite food is New York pizza, he drinks chai tea and takes acting lessons with the hope of one day being in movies, although he does not want to become a shallow Hollywood movie star. He was somewhat scared of acting at first, but now he enjoys it, saying "performing is such a rush". Ellis was the second least produced of the My Scene boys and was discontinued in 2004 after he moved. He is named after Ellis Island in New York. Ellis is voiced by Shane Meier.
 Tyson is Jamaican with brown skin, blonde hair, and hazel eyes. He likes surfing and flirting with girls. His astrological sign is Scorpio. He owns a 5-star hotel named Jamaican Palms. His love interest is Chelsea, and was sold in the "Jammin' in Jamaica: Surfrider" line.
 Ryan Ridley - like Lindsay Lohan, he's an actor and also a screenwriter and producer. Despite he has dark brown hair with matching eye color and a pale skin tone, the "My Scene Goes Hollywood" film has a tanned one. Ryan is voiced by Samuel Vincent.

 Pets 
Each of the My Scene girls (and three of the boys) own pets. Barbie/Kennedy's, Chelsea's, Madison's, and Nolee's are all introduced in Wave 2. Delancey's kittens were introduced in the "Getting Ready" wave, and her adult cat was introduced in "Masquerade Madness". Kenzie's unnamed brown Yorkie is introduced in "Masquerade Madness". Hudson's dog is introduced in "Getting Ready", while River's and Sutton's are introduced in "Masquerade Madness".

 Yorkie, is a Yorkshire Terrier owned by Barbie (and later, Kennedy). According to the My Scene website, Yorkie is a female. However, since Yorkie is presented as a white dog, she could well be a West Highland Terrier (Westie) but her breed is uncertain.
 Mambo, also known as Churro, is a chihuahua owned by Chelsea. The My Scene website stated that he is male, but he is shown wearing female clothing in the "Teen T-Shirts" line.
 Bella is a Carlin Pinscher owned by Madison. Bella is a female, confirmed by the My Scene website, and by her name.
 Cookie is a Pug owned by Nolee(and later, Nia).  He is male.
 Sugar is an adult female cat owned by Delancey. Sugar gave birth to kittens in the "Getting Ready" line, including Pinky, the only kitten that Delancey kept.
 Coco is Kenzie's brown Yorkshire Terrier.
 Blanca is Jai's Carlin Pinscher.
 St. Bernard, is Hudson's' unnamed St. Bernard. It was the only male-owned pet to introduce before "Masquerade Madness", and it is the only one of the male's dogs to be produced twice. The dog was quite large in "Getting Ready", where it was introduced. It was shrunk to the other pet's sizes in its second appearance ("Masquerade Madness"), however.
 Bull Mastiff, is River's unnamed Bull Mastiff. It was introduced in "Masquerade Madness".
 Husky, is Sutton's''' unnamed Husky. It was introduced in "Masquerade Madness".

See also 

 Barbie
 Barbie's friends and family
 Barbie (media franchise)
 My Scene: Jammin' in Jamaica
 My Scene Goes Hollywood: The Movie
 Bratz

References

External links 
MyScene U.S.
MyScene UK

Mattel
Fashion dolls
Products introduced in 2002
Products and services discontinued in 2011
2000s toys
2010s toys
Toy controversies
2002 web series debuts
2008 web series endings